was a Japanese songwriter, famous for his many children's songs and popular songs (ryūkōka) that have become deeply embedded in Japanese popular culture.

Nakayama was born in Nagano Prefecture, Nakano City, in 1887. His father died while he was very young, and his mother Zō raised Shimpei, his older brother and other siblings alone. She often took in washing and sewing to make ends meet. Shimpei was interested in music from the time he attended Nakano Elementary School, where he and his classmates would sing to the accompaniment of a small organ (what he called a "baby organ"). The songs they sang included popular military marches from the Sino-Japanese War (1894–95). At one point a small brass band sponsored by the Salvation Army came to town to play, and Nakayama remembers being smitten by the sound. His classmates remember him as an accomplished player of the Japanese transverse flute who would often play during Obon and other festivals at the local Shinto shrines and Buddhist temple.

When Shimpei graduated from elementary school he took the required examinations and became a substitute elementary school teacher. His dream was to become a music teacher. For that, he had to go to school in Tokyo. So in 1905 he moved to Japan's capital city and became a household servant for Waseda University English Literature professor Shimamura Hōgetsu.

In 1914, Nakayama composed the song "Katyusha's song" for a dramatization of Tolstoy's Resurrection. The song, sung by actress Sumako Matsui, was a massive hit and Nakayama became famous almost overnight. Today this song is considered one of the earliest examples of modern Japanese popular music.

Another of his most famous songs is "Tokyo ondo", which was a great countrywide hit in the 1930s. Today it is also known as the theme song of the  baseball team Tokyo Yakult Swallows.

His most famous children's songs are "Shabondama", "Teru teru bozu", "Amefuri", "Ano machi kono machi" and "Sekurabe", among others.

Nakayama's song "Gondola no Uta" features prominently in Akira Kurosawa's film Ikiru.

References / External links

The International Shakuhachi Society, "Mari to Tonosama"
The International Shakuhachi Society, "Habu no Minato"

1887 births
1952 deaths
20th-century Japanese composers
20th-century Japanese male musicians
Children's musicians
Concert band composers
Japanese composers
Japanese male composers
Japanese songwriters
Musicians from Nagano Prefecture
People from Nagano Prefecture